The women's middleweight boxing competition at the 2016 Olympic Games in Rio de Janeiro was held from 14 to 21 August at the Riocentro.

The medals for the competition were presented by Wu Ching-kuo, Chinese Taipei, IOC member and President of the AIBA, and the gifts were presented by Franco Falcinelli, Vice President of the AIBA.

Schedule 
All times are Brasília Time (UTC−3).

Results

References

Boxing at the 2016 Summer Olympics
Women's events at the 2016 Summer Olympics
2016 in women's boxing